Cyrtodactylus salomonensis is a species of gecko that is endemic to the Solomon Islands.

References 

Cyrtodactylus
Reptiles described in 2007